Kika is an international chain of furniture stores, headquartered in Austria. It has 70 stores, most of them in Europe.

History 
In June 2013, Steinhoff International acquired Kika-Leiner, which operated 73 stores.

In June 2018, the Signa Holding, a real estate and retail investor, acquired from Steinhoff International the Kika-Leiner retail outlets, which operated 100 stores and managed 6,500 employees.

Kika locations in Austria 
Kika locations in Austria 2019:

 in Burgenland: Eisenstadt, Unterwart
 in Carinthia: Klagenfurt
 in Lower Austria: Horn, Mistelbach, Stockerau, Sankt Pölten, Wiener Neustadt
 in Upper Austria: Ansfelden, Linz, Aurolzmünster / Ried im Innkreis
 in Salzburg: Eugendorf, Saalfelden, St Johann im Pongau
 in Styria: Feldbach, Graz, Leoben, Liezen
 in Tyrol: Lienz (Nussdorf/Debant), Imst, Innsbruck, Wörgl
 in Vorarlberg: Dornbirn
 in Vienna: Favoriten, Ottakring, Donaustadt

References

External links
Kika homepage (in German)

Retail companies of Austria
Retail companies established in 1973